Ricardo E. Alegría Gallardo (April 14, 1921 – July 7, 2011) was a Puerto Rican scholar, cultural anthropologist and archaeologist known as the "father of modern Puerto Rican archaeology".

Early years
Alegría was born in San Juan, Puerto Rico where he received his primary and secondary education. His father, José S. Alegría, was a former vice president and founding member of the Puerto Rican Nationalist Party. It was Alegría's father who instilled in him a sense of love and pride for Puerto Rico, its history, and culture.  In 1941 at the University of Puerto Rico, together with Yamil Galib, Alegría founded a new fraternity, Alpha Beta Chi. In 1942, Alegría earned his Bachelor of Science degree in archeology from the University of Puerto Rico. He continued his academic education in the University of Chicago where in 1947 he earned his master's in Anthropology and History. In 1954, Alegría earned his Ph.D (doctorate) in Anthropology from Harvard University.

Legacy and death
Alegría was named the first director of the Institute of Puerto Rican Culture by Luis Muñoz Marín, Puerto Rico's first elected governor.  He was responsible for the creation of the "Archaeological Center of Investigation of the University of Puerto Rico"(UPR).  Alegría also created the "Center of Popular Arts of the Puerto Rican Cultural Institute", the program of publication of books of the institute, and created the logo for the Institute of Neurobiology in Puerto Rico.

Alegría was responsible for the renovation and restoration of historical Old San Juan under the leadership of then San Juan mayor Felisa Rincón de Gautier. He is also responsible for the restoration of the ruins of "Caparra" and "Fort San Jeronimo". As a result of his work "Old San Juan" was declared a "Historical World Treasure". In 1976, Alegría opened the "Center of Advanced Studies of Puerto Rico and the Caribbean". In 1992, he established the "Museum of the Americas".

Alegría is considered a pioneer in the anthropologic studies of the Taino culture and the African heritage in Puerto Rico by the Smithsonian Institution. Caribbean Business points out that, "His extensive studies have helped historians understand how the Taínos lived and suffered, before and after the Spanish conquistadors arrived on the island." Alegría estimated that about one third of all Puerto Ricans have Taíno blood—results of recent DNA studies have proved him right.

Nobel laureate Mario Vargas Llosa became inspired by Alegría's work and incorporated a fictional character based on him, named Ricardo Santurce, in his play El loco de los balcones.

Ricardo Alegría lived in Old San Juan in his later years, until his death on July 7, 2011. He had been hospitalized in San Juan's Centro Medico (Medical Center Hospital) a few weeks before his death. After a brief recovery, he relapsed, and was returned to the medical center, where he died of heart failure.

Awards and recognitions

In 1993, President Bill Clinton presented Alegría with the "Charles Frankel Prize" for his contributions in the field of archaeology.  In 1996, he was awarded the "James Smithson Bicentennial Medal".  In 2001, Alegría received from the hands of Nancy Morejon "The Haydee Santamaria Medal" in Havana, Cuba.  In 2002, Alegría received the "Luis Muñoz Marín Medal" in recognition of his life achievements from Puerto Rican Governor Sila Calderón.  Puerto Rican artist Lorenzo Homar honored Alegría by making an artistic graphic poster of him.

Alegría also received recognition from cultural and architectural organizations in Peru, Venezuela, Mexico and the Dominican Republic, where he also received an honorary doctorate. The city of Havana recognized his influence in the project to remodel the city's historical district (similar to Alegría's work in Old San Juan) by honoring him with a plaque, which, while he was alive, was the only monument honoring a living Puerto Rican in the entire city.

Puerto Rican folk duo Los Niños Estelares dedicated a tribute song to Alegría, named "Alegría, Doctor Alegría", in their 2010 album, Namasté. In it they describe many of Alegría's accomplishments, his educational background, and -partly in jest, due to Alegría's impressive credentials- likened him to Indiana Jones. In the lyrics, they name Alegría "the last Puerto Rican hero."

Works
The following is a list of books which Alegría has either authored or co-authored.

See also

List of Puerto Ricans
Puerto Rican scientists and inventors

Notes

References

External links
 Jornada Centenario - Ricardo E. Alegría Gallardo

1921 births
2011 deaths
Burials at Santa María Magdalena de Pazzis Cemetery
Puerto Rican archaeologists
Cultural anthropologists
Puerto Rican anthropologists
Puerto Rican scientists
Puerto Rican educators
Puerto Rican non-fiction writers
Harvard Graduate School of Arts and Sciences alumni
People from San Juan, Puerto Rico
University of Chicago alumni
National Humanities Medal recipients
American Folklorists of Color